The Xiegong Bridge is a historic stone arch bridge over the West Stream in Yuecheng District of Shaoxing, Zhejiang, China.

Etymology
Xiegong Bridge is named after Xie Gong, a prefecture chief during the Later Jin dynasty (936–947).

History
The original bridge dates back to the Later Jin dynasty (936–947). The present version was completed in 1685, during the ruling of Kangxi Emperor of the Qing dynasty (1644–1911).

On 6 May 2013, it was listed among the seventh batch of "Major National Historical and Cultural Sites in Zhejiang" by the State Council of China.

Gallery

Surrounding area
 , head of the cabinet of the Ming Empire (1368–1644).

References

Bridges in Zhejiang
Arch bridges in China
Bridges completed in 1685
Qing dynasty architecture
Buildings and structures completed in 1685
1685 establishments in China
Major National Historical and Cultural Sites in Zhejiang